Rayllan Campos Santos is a Brazilian footballer who plays as an attacking midfielder for Portuguesa Santista.

He played for Atlético Goianiense in the top level of Brazilian football in 2012. He made his debut at the as a substitute in the fourth round game against Portuguesa on 10 June, and his full debut on 11 August against Santos.

Rayllan also represented Sampaio Corrêa in 2016 Campeonato Brasileiro Série B. He has had two spells in Campeonato Brasileiro Série D, for his first club Bahia de Feira in 2011, and for Treze in 2018.

References

External links
Rayllan at ZeroZero

Living people
1989 births
Brazilian footballers
Associação Desportiva Bahia de Feira players
Atlético Clube Goianiense players
Associação Cultural e Desportiva Potiguar players
Grêmio Novorizontino players
Sampaio Corrêa Futebol Clube players
Rio Claro Futebol Clube players
Associação Atlética Portuguesa (RJ) players
Treze Futebol Clube players
Associação Atlética Portuguesa (Santos) players
Campeonato Brasileiro Série A players
Campeonato Brasileiro Série B players
Campeonato Brasileiro Série D players
Association football midfielders